Symphony No. 9 is a composition by the Brazilian composer Heitor Villa-Lobos, written in 1952. A performance lasts about twenty minutes.

History
Villa-Lobos composed his Ninth Symphony in Rio de Janeiro in 1952. It was first performed by the Philadelphia Orchestra, conducted by Eugene Ormandy. The score is dedicated to Mindinha (Arminda Neves d'Almeida), the composer's companion for the last 23 years of his life.

Instrumentation
The symphony is scored for an orchestra consisting of piccolo, 2 flutes, 2 oboes, cor anglais, 2 clarinets, bass clarinet, 2 bassoons, contrabassoon, 4 horns, 4 trumpets, 4 trombones, tuba, timpani, tam-tam, cymbals, coconut hulls, bass drum, xylophone, vibraphone, celesta, harp, and strings.

Analysis
The symphony has four movements:
 Allegro
 Adagio
 Scherzo (Vivace)
 Allegro (giusto)

References

Cited sources

Further reading
 Béhague, Gerard. 1994. Villa-Lobos: The Search for Brazil's Musical Soul. Austin: Institute of Latin American Studies, University of Texas at Austin, 1994. .
 Enyart, John William. 1984. "The Symphonies of Heitor Villa-Lobos". PhD diss. Cincinnati: University of Cincinnati.
 Peppercorn, Lisa M. 1991. Villa-Lobos: The Music: An Analysis of His Style, translated by Stefan de Haan. London: Kahn & Averill; White Plains, New York: Pro/Am Music Resources Inc.  (Kahn & Averill); .
 Salles, Paulo de Tarso. 2009. Villa-Lobos: processos composicionais. Campinas, SP: Editora da Unicamp. .

Symphonies by Heitor Villa-Lobos
1952 compositions
Music with dedications